Brakefield is a surname. Notable people with the surname include:

Jim Brakefield (1919–2002), American football and baseball coach
Paul Brakefield (born 1952), British evolutionary biologist

See also
Brakefield Green, a village in Norfolk, England